Antoine Jacques Philippe de Marigny de Mandeville (1811–1890), (also known as Antoine James de Marigny and Mandeville de Marigny), was the son of Bernard de Marigny de Mandeville and Anna Mathilde Morales, and the son-in-law of William C. C. Claiborne, the first Governor of Louisiana after statehood. He was a planter, merchant, military officer, and U.S. Marshal for eastern Louisiana.

Youth & personal life
As a young man, he attended the Academy of St. Cyr and the Royal Cavalry School at Saumur in the 1830s, before serving two to three years as a lieutenant in the French Cavalry.

In New Orleans, he married Sophronie Louise Claiborne, daughter of Governor William C. C. Claiborne and his third wife, Cayetana Susana Bosque y Fangui (who later married John Randolph Grymes). The couple had two daughters who died in infancy, Marie Felicité and Felicité Medora, and a son, James Mandeville Marigny (1849-1884).

American Civil War
During the American Civil War, he was a colonel in the 10th Louisiana Infantry ('French Brigade', 'French Legion') and served in Virginia.

St. Tammany Parish
He resided for much of his life in St. Tammany Parish, on the north shore of Lake Pontchartrain. In the 1870 U.S. Census, he is listed there in the community of Lewisburg.

References

External links

Confederate States Army officers
French Army officers
People from New Orleans
People of Louisiana (New France)
19th century in New Orleans
People of Louisiana in the American Civil War
1811 births
1890 deaths
People in 19th-century Louisiana
De Marigny family
Military personnel from Louisiana